The members of the 2nd Manitoba Legislature were elected in the Manitoba general election held in December 1874. The legislature sat from March 31, 1875, to November 11, 1878.

Premier Robert Atkinson Davis with the support of Joseph Royal was able to form a minority government. Davis offered a cabinet seat to John Norquay, which won him the support of moderate English-speaking members.

The Legislative Council of Manitoba was abolished. In 1874, representatives of the provincial government requested additional funding from the federal government in Ottawa. The federal cabinet agreed on the condition that the legislative council be abolished. The council itself rejected two bills calling for its abolition. Finally, in 1876, a sufficient number of members of the council were persuaded by the lieutenant-governor to support the bill.

Joseph Dubuc served as speaker for the assembly.

There were four sessions of the 2nd Legislature:

Alexander Morris was Lieutenant Governor of Manitoba until October 8, 1877, when Joseph-Édouard Cauchon became lieutenant governor.

Members of the Assembly 
The following members were elected to the assembly in 1874:

Notes:

By-elections 
By-elections were held to replace members for various reasons:

Notes:

References 

Terms of the Manitoba Legislature
1875 establishments in Manitoba
1878 disestablishments in Manitoba